Amikumu is a cross-platform app for smartphones (Android and iOS) which can be used to find people nearby who speak or learn the same languages as the user. The app was launched for Esperanto speakers on 22 April 2017 and for speakers of all languages during LangFest in Montreal on 25 August 2017. On 9 August 2018 Amikumu had members in more than 130 countries speaking 588 languages.

Architecture 
The Android app is written in Java and Kotlin, the iOS app in Swift, and the server in Ruby on Rails.

Kickstarter campaign 
Amikumu was funded in part using Kickstarter. The Kickstarter campaign, organized by Esperanto speakers Chuck Smith and Richard "Evildea" Delamore, launched on 18 October 2016. More than 3000 euros were collected in the first 10 hours after the campaign started. The original goal of the campaign was 8500 euros, which was reached in 27 hours. The campaign went on until 16 November 2016, collecting a total of 26,671 euros, which is over three times more than the original goal.

References

External links 
 

2017 software
Android (operating system) software
Communication software
Esperanto
Geosocial networking
iOS software
Mobile social software
Proprietary cross-platform software